Spanish Gulch is a valley in the U.S. state of Oregon.

Spanish Gulch was named in the 1850s after a "Spanish" mining operation.

References

Landforms of Jackson County, Oregon
Valleys of Oregon